Tvrdošovce is a large village and municipality in the Nové Zámky District in the Nitra Region of south-west Slovakia.

Geography
The municipality lies at an altitude of 120 metres and covers an area of 55.56 km².

History
In historical records, the village was first mentioned in 1221.
After the Austro-Hungarian army disintegrated in November 1918, Czechoslovak troops occupied the area, later acknowledged internationally by the Treaty of Trianon. Between 1938 and 1945 Tvrdošovce once more  became part of Miklós Horthy's Hungary through the First Vienna Award. From 1945 until the Velvet Divorce, it was part of Czechoslovakia. Since then it has been part of Slovakia.

Population
It has a population of 5088 people.

Facilities
The village has a small public library, swimming pool, gym and a football pitch.

Photos

External links
 https://web.archive.org/web/20070513023228/http://www.statistics.sk/mosmis/eng/run.html 
 Tvrdošovce – Nové Zámky Okolie

Villages and municipalities in Nové Zámky District
Hungarian communities in Slovakia